San Mateo District may refer to:

 San Mateo District, Huarochirí, in Huarochirí province, Lima region, Peru
 San Mateo District, San Mateo, in San Mateo (canton), Alajuela province, Costa Rica
 San Mateo de Otao District, in Huarochirí province, Lima region, Peru

See also
 San Mateo (disambiguation)